Richard "Richie" Stearns (born January 29, 1955 in Illinois) is an American sailor. He became second the 1969 Soling North American Championship together with his father, Richard Stearns, and Bruce Goldsmith. Stearns did 3 Olympic campaigns in the Soling, won the Soling Great Lakes championship and was main trimmer and sail co-coordinator during the Americas Cup Campaign Heart of America.

Publications
Stearns published, with Adam Cort, .

References

1955 births
Living people
People from Illinois
American male sailors (sport)
Soling class sailors
America's Cup sailors